The Oakland Tribune is a weekly newspaper published in Oakland, California, by the Bay Area News Group (BANG), a subsidiary of MediaNews Group.

Founded in 1874, the Tribune rose to become an influential daily newspaper. With the decline of print media, in March 2016, parent company Digital First Media announced that the Tribune would fold into a new newspaper entitled the East Bay Times along with the company's other newspapers in the East Bay starting April 5, 2016. The former nameplates of the consolidated newspapers will continue to be published every Friday as weekly community supplements.

Origin
The Tribune was founded February 21, 1874, by George Staniford and Benet A. Dewes. The Oakland Daily Tribune was first printed at 468 Ninth St. as a 4-page, 3-column newspaper, 6 by 10 inches. Staniford and Dewes gave out copies free of charge. The paper had news stories and 43 advertisements.

Staniford, the editor and Dewes, the printer, were credited with producing a paper with fine typographical look and editorial nature. The competition was the Oakland News and Oakland Transcript. The first editorial stated, "There seems to be an open field for a journal like the Tribune in Oakland, and we accordingly proceed to occupy it, presenting the Tribune, which is intended to be a permanent daily paper, deriving its support solely from advertising patronage."

Later that year, Staniford sold his half interest to Dewes; then, Dewes sold a half interest to A.B. Gibson. The Tribune moved, January 30, 1875, to 911 Broadway and Gibson sold his half interest to the paper to A. E. Nightingill. In 1876, Dewes and Nightingill, found a buyer for the Tribune.

The William Dargie era

The Tribune became a major paper under William E. Dargie (1854–1911), who acquired the paper July 24, 1876. The Tribune Publishing Company, was created with William Edward Dargie as Manager and (Albion Keith Paris) A. K. P. Harmon, Jr., Secretary.

The Tribune was a solid Republican newspaper under Dargie and (later) the Knowlands. Dargie was a news innovator in several ways: 1876, wire service dispatches; 1877, a book and job department added; 1878, when the Bell Telephone System arrived in Oakland, one of the first telephones was installed at the Tribune- Number 46; 1883, a Saturday edition was introduced; 1887, special editions; 1888, an extra for the presidential election.

On August 28, 1891, the name Oakland Tribune was officially adopted. Prior names include Oakland Daily Tribune, the Oakland Evening Tribune and the Oakland Daily Evening Tribune. Dargie had news offices in New York and Chicago. Dargie also acquired a patent approved R. Hoe & Co. double cylinder press.

The Tribune was a charter member of the Associated Press upon its founding in 1900.

Among Dargie's hires, at the turn of the century, was Jack Gunin, a one-eyed lensman, the first full-time photojournalist in the Western United States.

In 1906, the Tribune added a Sunday edition.

1906 earthquake

The newspapers of San Francisco were destroyed in the earthquake and fire of April 18, 1906. The Tribune printed many "extras."  Dargie lent the Tribunes presses for a joint edition of the San Francisco Call-Chronicle-Examiner. In the aftermath of the conflagration, San Francisco Mayor Eugene E. Schmitz, declared the Oakland Tribune the official San Francisco newspaper.

The circulation grew as displaced San Franciscans moved to Oakland and Alameda County. The Tribunes editorial direction was then under Managing Editor John Conners. After 35 years as publisher, William E. Dargie died on February 10, 1911. Former Oakland Mayor Melvin C. Chapman served as acting president of the Tribune Publishing Company. Bruno Albert Forsterer (1869–1957), was publisher and general manager. He was executor of Dargie's estate. Bruno and his son, Harold B. Forsterer, also served the Knowlands and the Tribune.

The Knowland Family era

After five terms in the United States House of Representatives, Joseph R. Knowland (1873–1966) purchased the Oakland Tribune from Dargie's widow, Hermina Peralta Dargie. In his first edition as publisher of the Oakland Tribune, November 14, 1915, he wrote, "It is perfectly understood that what the Tribune does, rather than what it promises, will determine the true measure of its worth; and with that understanding, the Tribune, under its new control, girds to its work."

Knowland moved the Tribune to a new location at 13th and Franklin Streets on March 25, 1918. Under Knowland, the Tribune became one-third of a triumvirate of California Republican newspapers with conservative viewpoints, along with the Los Angeles Times and San Francisco Chronicle. The Tribune endorsed Republican candidates and "J.R." (as Knowland was widely known) often picked and controlled Republican elected officials. The Tribune would make many political careers, the most noted being Knowland's own son William F. Knowland and Earl Warren.

In 1921, Knowland started radio station KLX and his newspaper library. The 305 feet tall Tribune Tower, an Oakland landmark,  was completed in 1923. The Tribune moved its business into the tower in 1924. The Tribune Publishing Corporation, was founded by Knowland on January 4, 1928. The publishing corporation held interests in KLX, part owner of a paper mill in Tacoma, Washington and subsidiary businesses, U-Bild, Tower Graphics and Tribune Features, Inc.

In the mid-1930s, J.R. tied in with the Associated Press Wirephoto Service. He had a direct wire link for international news from London, England. The mast head logo, which became an icon of the paper, showed Oakland, a port to the world and nation. The logo changed with the times: the Tower, transport ship and steam locomotive; in later years, the Tower, the Bay Bridge, larger transport ship, diesel engine, the china clipper and later, a jet airplane.

On September 1, 1950, the Tribune became the sole Oakland daily newspaper, with the demise of its competitor, William Randolph Hearst's Oakland Post Enquirer.

In 1960, Joseph R. Knowland's son, former U.S. Senator William F. Knowland (1908–1974), was named editor; he had shared being assistant publisher with his brother, Joseph Russell "Russ" Knowland, Jr. (1901–1961), since 1933. Russ Knowland's 1961 death made his brother Bill sole successor to their father.

On February 1, 1966, Joseph R. Knowland died at the age of 92. William F. Knowland was appointed president and publisher. His son, Joseph William Knowland became vice-president and general manager. Bill Knowland added to the logo, A Responsible Metropolitan Newspaper. The Senator had assumed duties as the Tribunes publisher and editor. He became the president of The Tribune Publishing Corporation.

Under Bill Knowland's ownership, the Tribune had a conservative editorial position and a reputation for being strongly pro-business. As the city of Oakland became more ethnically and politically diverse in the 1960s and 1970s, the Tribune was unable to respond quickly enough to the demographic changes (and the political and social unrest exemplified, among other factors, by the University of California, Berkeley, student uprisings and the Black Panther movement).

The Tribunes readership declined after the early 1960s as a large portion of the paper's traditional subscription base relocated to the newly developing suburbs south and east of Oakland. In southern Alameda County, the readership went to Floyd Sparks's The (Hayward) Daily Review and in Contra Costa County to Dean Lesher's Contra Costa Times.

In 1973, Bill Knowland wrote in Fortune magazine, "Any city needs a means of communication between the diverse members of its community. Communication is essential."

Bill Knowland's personal life would soon affect the Oakland Tribune. Two days after the Tribune celebrated its 100th anniversary on February 21, 1974, William F. Knowland committed suicide. On the death of their father, Joseph William Knowland (1930- ), became the Tribunes editor and publisher; Emelyn K. Jewett (1929–1988) became president of The Tribune Publishing Corporation.

The California Press Association honored Joseph W. Knowland, as the winner of the 1975, Publisher of the Year award. This honor was bestowed on Joe Knowland for his progressive innovations in the operations and makeup of the newspaper.

End of the Knowland Era: CCC and Gannett

In 1977, the Knowland Family sold the Oakland Tribune to Combined Communications Corporation, owned by Arizona-based outdoor sign mogul Karl Eller. The Tribune Publishing Corporation, was dissolved by the Knowland Family. Eller had recently acquired The Cincinnati Enquirer. In 1979, CCC merged with the East Coast-based media conglomerate Gannett Company, and the Tribune was thus acquired by Gannett Company. That year, Allen H. Neuharth, Gannett CEO, used the Tribune as a pilot project with a new morning paper called East Bay Today, which served as an early prototype of Gannett's later national paper USA Today. In 1979, Gannett named Robert C. Maynard (1937–1993) editor, becoming the first African-American editor in the paper's history. In 1983, Maynard—who by this time had become publisher and with Gannett's blessing—consolidated the Tribune and East Bay Today into a single morning newspaper under the Tribune name.

The Maynard era

In 1983, Maynard and his wife, Nancy Hicks Maynard, purchased the Tribune from Gannett for $17 million (financed by a loan from Gannett) in the first management-led leveraged buyout in U.S. newspaper history. It was also historic for the Tribune becoming the first major metropolitan daily newspaper owned by an African-American. This was seen as especially notable as Oakland was developing a relatively large African-American community which, by the 1980s, was becoming increasingly influential in local business and politics. Maynard helped restore the paper's reputation, earning a Pulitzer Prize in 1990.

But for all of its editorial kudos under Maynard, the Tribune still was plagued by financial difficulties beyond Maynard's control. Facing a debt of $31.5 million and on the brink of folding in August 1991, the Tribune was saved by the Freedom Forum, Allen H. Neuharth's media foundation. The Freedom Forum paid Gannett $2.5 million, retired the Tribunes debt and gave Maynard $5 million in operating funds. But the rescue proved to be short-lived, and the continuing financial pressures—combined with the disclosure in July 1992 that Robert Maynard had been diagnosed with terminal prostate cancer—forced the Maynards to put the Tribune up for sale.

The Tribune Tower was severely damaged in the Loma Prieta earthquake of October 17, 1989, yet the paper continued to publish there until ANG moved it to a building located at Oakland's Jack London Square at the edge of San Francisco Bay. The Tower sat empty until 1995, when John Protopappas purchased it for $300,000. His company, Madison Park Financial Corporation, renovated the Tower in the late 1990s. The Tribune returned to the Tower after it reopened in 1999.

ANG and InsideBayArea.com
On October 15, 1992, the Alameda Newspaper Group (Now the Bay Area News Group), a division of MediaNews Group that published several competing suburban community newspapers, agreed to buy the Tribune for $10 million from the Maynards. The final issue of the Tribune under the Maynards rolled off the Tribune Tower's presses on November 30, 1992; and the first issue under ANG's ownership was printed at the company's Hayward plant the following day. As a result, the Tribune was no longer considered the dominant East Bay newspaper.

The group's entry into the computer age was first discussed at the 1983 International Typographical Union convention; newspaper internet websites came of age in the mid- and late-1990s. The ANG official website was InsideBayArea.com for the online Oakland Tribune; the website was shared with other ANG/MediaNews newspapers.

On May 20, 2007, the Tribune moved permanently from the Tribune Tower to new offices on Oakport Street, across Interstate 880 from the Oakland Coliseum. The Tribune Tower, a local and national landmark, remains, now housing several businesses and a ground-floor cafe.

On August 2, 2007, Oakland Post editor and former (1993–2005) Tribune journalist Chauncey Bailey was murdered in a targeted hit on his way to work. This led the Tribune to start "The Chauncey Bailey Project", a series of articles focusing on the causes and aftermaths of the murder.

In 2011, BANG announced a plan to merge the Tribune with other sister East Bay newspapers, but on October 27, 2011, BANG announced that it would retain The Oakland Tribune masthead.

On August 30, 2012, the Tribune moved its offices to 1970 Broadway in Oakland's Uptown district.

The last daily edition of the Tribune was published on April 4, 2016, as it was combined with other BANG-owned East Bay papers the Contra Costa Times, Hayward Daily Review and Fremont Argus the new East Bay Times nameplate.

Pulitzer Prizes

The Oakland Tribune won the Pulitzer Prize for a photograph of a small private plane narrowly missing a B-29 Superfortress in 1950, and again for photographs of the aftermath of the October 17, 1989, Loma Prieta earthquake.

Sources

Allen, Annalee. Selections From The Oakland Tribune Archive. San Francisco: Arcadia Publishing, 2006.
Collier, Peter. A Press Dynasty Topples in Oakland. More, September 1977.
Gothberg, John Alfred. The Local Influence of Joseph R. Knowland's Oakland Tribune.  Minneapolis Journalism Quarterly, 1968.
Centennial Souvenir Edition, Oakland Daily Tribune, February 21, 1974.
The majority of this article is from the History of the Oakland Tribune.
Proud Old Paper Has Known Power, Glory, (Oakland Tribune) San Francisco Chronicle, October 16, 1992.

References

External links
 
 Oakland Museum of California Oakland Tribune Collection of news negatives and photographs.

 
Newspapers published in the San Francisco Bay Area
Mass media in Oakland, California
Companies based in Oakland, California
Companies based in San Jose, California
MediaNews Group publications
Publications established in 1874
1874 establishments in California
19th century in Oakland, California
Weekly newspapers published in California